Allen Dial House, located on Cedar Valley Farm, is a historic home located near Laurens, Laurens County, South Carolina. It was built about 1855, and is a -story, rectangular frame dwelling sheathed in narrow width weatherboard in a vernacular interpretation of the Greek Revival style. It sits on a high stuccoed masonry foundation.  The front facade features a pedimented portico supported by four paired and fluted pillars.  Also on the property is a rectangular one-story outbuilding, originally a kitchen.

It was added to the National Register of Historic Places in 1982.

Cedar Valley Farm was acquired by Charles Carrington Herbert, Sr. and his wife Mary Herbert, in 1950. They lived in the Allen Dial House on the farm, until their deaths in 2016 and 2018, respectively.  Cedar Valley Farm was acquired by William P. Crawford, Jr. and Marion R. Crawford in 2018.

Cedar Valley Farm consists of approximately 515 acres of hardwood and pine forests, as well as several ponds.

References

Houses on the National Register of Historic Places in South Carolina
Greek Revival houses in South Carolina
Houses completed in 1855
Houses in Laurens County, South Carolina
National Register of Historic Places in Laurens County, South Carolina